Ruská Voľa nad Popradom is a village and municipality in Stará Ľubovňa District in the Prešov Region of northern Slovakia.

History
In historical records the village was first mentioned in 1357.

Other names of the municipality: 1588 Nowawolya, Volya, 1635 Volya, noviter sicata, 1773 Ruska Wolya, Orosz-Volya, 1786 Orosz Wolya, 1808 Orosz-Alsó-Vólya et Orosz Felso-Volya, Ruská Wola, 1863 Oroszvolya, 1907 Poprádokros, 1920 Ruská Voľa, 1960 Ruská Voľa nad Popradom, in Hungarian Poprádokros.

The territory between the Poprad and the Obručné rivers, which was mostly forested, was received, in 1312, by noble Rikolf, owner of the Kamenica estate, from King Karol Róbert (Charles Robert). However, at that time the municipality did not exist. The first report of the existence of the municipality goes back to the year 1588, when it was allegedly taken over by Juraj Horvát, owner of the Plaveč estate. The village, however, existed already before the year 1588. it was established around 1580. Its original name Vôľa proves that the village was established by šoltýs with settlers based on emfyteutic right.

The subjects were obliged to pay taxes to the king for the first time as late as in 1600. at that time the settlement that at least 7 houses. The population predominantly consisted of liege people. They were wood cutters or sheep shepherds with small arable land. As late as in 1636 they were not considered farmers but owners of small property only. In 1718 11 families left the village and moved to Poland. In 1787, the village had 12 and in 1828 33 houses.

In the 19th century the Bornemis and Dezofi families had their estates there. Inhabitants were farmers, cattle raisers and worked in forests. After 1918 the economic activity of inhabitants did not change. During the 2nd world war the inhabitants helped Polish refugees, supported illegal workers and guerilla groups operating in the vicinity.

The municipality was liberated on 21 January 1945. After liberation, the revolutionary national council was established. The 1946 elections were won by KSS, out of 149 votes it received 73, DS (Democratic Party) 24, Strana práce (Labour Party) 48, Strana slobody (Freedom Party) 2 votes. In 1947 5 families and 3 citizens opted to move to the USSR.

Electricity was introduced to the village in 1959, public lighting, local radio, municipal council building were built in 1965, Jednota SD in 1973, local roads, water supply system in 1983, tennis courts, pavements, new residential houses and other buildings were built too. Public cooperative farm (JRD) established in 1950, disintegrated. It was reestablished in 1958.

Demography
Inhabitants 
 1787 - 114 inh., 
 1828 - 260 inh., 
 1869 - 293 inh., 
 1880 - 236 inh., 
 1890 - 235 inh., 
 1900 - 179 inh., 
 1910 - 208 inh., 
 1921 - 188 inh., 
 1930 - 216 inh., 
 1940 - 227 inh., 
 1948 - 191 inh., 
 1961 - 207 inh., 
 1970 - 205 inh., 
 1980 - 183 inh., 
 1991 - 123 inh., 
 2009 – est. 108 inh.

Geography
The municipality lies at an altitude of 515 metres and covers an area of 6.023 km². It has a population of about 108 people. The Poprad River flows near the village.

Landmarks
 St. Michael church (Greek Catholic), single-aisle with presbytery, built in 1916-1919, re-built 1952.
 Jewish cemetery.

People
 Ján Fecko (1941) -  player of Taran Prešov handball team for many years, master of Sports and representative of the CSSR;
 Ján Birčák, Dr.h.c. prof. RNDr. PhD.  (1937) university teacher – physicist (http://naturescience.fhpv.unipo.sk/kontakty/bircak.htm)

External links
 http://www.statistics.sk/mosmis/eng/run.html

Villages and municipalities in Stará Ľubovňa District
Šariš